René Holten Poulsen (born 28 November 1988) is a Danish sprint canoeist, who has won medals at the Olympics, World Championships and European Championships. He won a silver medal in the men's K-2 1000 metres at the 2008 Summer Olympics.

He made his international debut in 2005, having begun paddling at the age of 12.

The Dane has won medals in various sprint events, but has primarily focused on the K-1 since 2009. He has won 5 world championships medals and was crowned double world champion in 2015 in Milan, winning both the K-1 1.000 meter and K-1 500 meter, only the sixth time this double has been won. He has one medal from the Olympic Games and 15 from European championships.  In June 2015, he competed in the inaugural European Games, for Denmark in canoe sprint, more specifically, Men's K-1 1000m. He earned a bronze medal.  He was also an ambassador for the 2015 European Games.

For his 2015 achievements, he has been nominated for both the World Paddle Awards 2015 and as the Sportsperson of the Year 2015 in Denmark.  He won both awards.

References

External links

Danish male canoeists
Canoeists at the 2008 Summer Olympics
Canoeists at the 2012 Summer Olympics
Canoeists at the 2016 Summer Olympics
Olympic canoeists of Denmark
Olympic silver medalists for Denmark
Olympic medalists in canoeing
Medalists at the 2008 Summer Olympics
People from Guldborgsund Municipality
1988 births
Living people
European Games medalists in canoeing
Canoeists at the 2015 European Games
European Games bronze medalists for Denmark
ICF Canoe Sprint World Championships medalists in kayak
Canoeists at the 2019 European Games
Sportspeople from Region Zealand